These are the full results of the 2022 NACAC Championships which were held at the Grand Bahama Sports Complex in Freeport, Bahamas, between August 19 and 21, 2022.

Men's results

100 meters

Heats – August 20Wind:Heat 1: -0.9 m/s, Heat 2: -1.5 m/s, Heat 3: -2.0 m/s

Final – August 20

Wind: -0.4 m/s

200 meters

Heats – August 19Wind:Heat 1: -0.4 m/s, Heat 2: -0.2 m/s, Heat 3: -0.1 m/s

Final – August 21

Wind: +0.6 m/s

400 meters

Heats – August 19

Final – August 20

800 meters
August 20

1500 meters
August 21

5000 meters
August 20

10,000 meters
August 19

110 meters hurdles
August 20Wind: +0.3 m/s

400 meters hurdles

Heats – August 19

Final – August 21

3000 meters steeplechase
August 21

4 × 100 meters relay
August 21

4 × 400 meters relay
August 21

20,000 meters walk
August 20

High jump
August 20

Pole vault
August 21

Long jump
Qualification – August 19

Final – August 21

Triple jump
August 19

Shot put
August 19

Discus throw
August 21

Hammer throw
August 20

Javelin throw
August 20

Women's results

100 meters

Heats – August 20Wind:Heat 1: +0.1 m/s, Heat 2: -1.5 m/s

Final – August 20

Wind: -0.1 m/s

200 meters

Heats – August 19Wind:Heat 1: -0.6 m/s, Heat 2: -0.3 m/s

Final – August 21

Wind: +0.3 m/s

400 meters

Heats – August 19

Final – August 20

800 meters
August 20

1500 meters
August 21

5000 meters
August 19

10,000 meters
August 20

100 meters hurdles

Heats – August 19Wind:Heat 1: -0.1 m/s, Heat 2: -0.7 m/s

Final – August 20

Wind: -0.8 m/s

400 meters hurdles
August 21

3000 meters steeplechase
August 19

4 × 100 meters relay
August 21

4 × 400 meters relay
August 21

20,000 meters walk
August 20

High jump
August 19

Pole vault
August 20

Long jump
August 20

Triple jump
August 21

Shot put
August 21

Discus throw
August 19

Hammer throw
August 19

Javelin throw
August 21

Mixed results

4 × 400 meters relay
August 20

References

Events at the NACAC Championships in Athletics
NACAC Championships in Athletics - Results